Fernando Octavio Assunção Formica (12 January 1931 in Montevideo – 3 May 2006 in São Paulo) was a Uruguayan historian, anthropologist, scholar, historian, and writer.

He specialized in social anthropology, writing works about Uruguayan folklore and the Gaucho.

Works 
 Génesis del tipo gaucho en el Río de la Plata (1957).
 Usos y costumbres del gaucho.
 Romancero oriental.
 El mate (Bolsilibros Arca, 1967).
 Pilchas criollas (1976, reeditado por Emecé en 1997). .
 Artigas, Inauguración de su Mausoleo y Glosario de Homenajes (en colaboración con Wilfredo Pérez).
 El perro cimarrón.
 Tradición, factor de integración cultural del individuo en la comunidad.
 De Uruguay, América y el Mundo.
 "Cuadernos del Boston", serie sobre los barrios de Montevideo, 1990–1993, en colaboración con Iris Bombet Franco:
 1. La Ciudad Vieja,
 2. La Aguada,
 3. La Unión,
 4. Pocitos,
 5. 18 de Julio,
 6. Colón.
 Uruguay, lo mejor de lo nuestro (con fotografías de Julio Testoni).
 El tango y sus circunstancias (El Ateneo, Buenos Aires).
 Colonia del Sacramento, Patrimonio Mundial (coautoría con Antonio Cravotto, prólogo de Federico Mayor Zaragoza, introducción de Marta Canessa de Sanguinetti; Ediciones UNESCO, Montevideo, 1996).
 Epopeya y tragedia de Manuel de Lobo. Biografía del fundador de Colonia del Sacramento (1635–1683) (Linardi y Risso, 2003).
 Historia del gaucho (Claridad, 2006). .
 El caballo criollo (Emecé, Buenos Aires, 2008).
 Bailes criollos rioplatenses (con Olga Fernández Latour de Botas y Beatriz Durante, Claridad, 2012)

References

1931 births
2006 deaths
Uruguayan people of Portuguese descent
20th-century Uruguayan historians
Uruguayan folklorists
Uruguayan anthropologists
Cultural anthropologists
21st-century Uruguayan historians
20th-century Uruguayan male writers
20th-century anthropologists